Clams and Mussels is a 2000 Argentine-Spanish comedy film directed and written by  based on a story by Lito Espinosa. It stars Leticia Brédice and Jorge Sanz alongside Loles León, Antonio Gasalla, and Silke.

Synopsis
Paula has money and convinces Rolondo to accompany her to play poker. Over time Rolondo falls in love with her, but as it turns out, Paula is a lesbian. Rolondo lives in the carnivals of Tenerife in the Pub Morocco (a gay bar) where Fredy performs (intimate friend of Paula). The atmosphere of absolute freedom and sensuality that surrounds him little by little opens mind Rolondo's mind.

Cast

Production Companies
Alma Ata International Pictures S.L.
Antena 3 Televisión
Buena Vista International Films Productions (in association with)
Millecento Cinema
Naya Films S.A. (in association with)
Patagonik Film Group
Vía Digital

Distributors
Argentina Video Home (Argentina) (video)
Buena Vista Home Entertainment (200?) (Brazil) (VHS)
Buena Vista International Spain S.A. (Spain)
Buena Vista International (Argentina)

Release 
The film premiered in 2000.

See also 
 List of Argentine films of 2000
 List of Spanish films of 2000

References

External links
 

2000 films
2000s Spanish-language films
Films directed by Marcos Carnevale
2000 LGBT-related films
Argentine LGBT-related films
Spanish LGBT-related films
2000 romantic comedy films
Spanish romantic comedy films
Argentine romantic comedy films
Buena Vista International films
2000s Argentine films
2000s Spanish films